Anastasija Tarasova (born 1 September 1998) is a Latvian footballer who plays as a forward for Sieviešu Futbola Līga club Liepājas Futbola skola. She has been a member of the Latvia women's national team.

References

1998 births
Living people
Latvian women's footballers
Women's association football forwards
Latvia women's youth international footballers
Latvia women's international footballers